Matador is a town in and the county seat of Motley County, Texas, United States. Its population was 607 at the 2010 census. In 1891, it was established by and named for the Matador Ranch.

History 
The Matador Ranch was consolidated in 1882 by a Scottish syndicate, and a post office opened at Matador in 1886.

At the end of the 19th century, townspeople freed the community from domination by the Matador Ranch, which was liquidated in 1951, by relocating nonranch families there and electing their own slate of officials.

The community was incorporated in 1912 and made the county seat. The state required that a town have at least 20 businesses. Local ranch hands hence established fraudulent, temporary businesses using ranch supplies. The only real business in Matador at the time was a saloon.

Geography

Matador is located at  (34.013996, –100.821646).

Matador is at the junction on conjoined US Route 62, U.S. Route 70, and State Highway 70.

Demographics

2020 census

As of the 2020 United States census, there were 569 people, 273 households, and 190 families residing in the town.

2000 census
As of the census of 2000, 740 people, 308 households, and 222 families resided in the town. The population density was 569.5 people/sq mi (219.8/km). The 395 housing units averaged 304.0/sq mi (117.3/km). The racial makeup of the town was 83.92% White, 5.68% African American, 1.22% Native American, 0.27% Asian, 0.27% Pacific Islander, 6.76% from other races, and 1.89% from two or more races. Hispanics or Latinos of any race were 13.24% of the population.

Of the 308 households, 30.8% had children under  18 living with them, 58.1% were married couples living together, 11.0% had a female householder with no husband present, and 27.9% were not families; 25.6% of all households were made up of individuals, and 15.3% had someone living alone who was 65 or older. The average household size was 2.40 and the average family size was 2.88.

In the town, the population was distributed as 26.2% under  18, 6.6% from 18 to 24, 21.2% from 25 to 44, 25.0% from 45 to 64, and 20.9% who were 65 years of age or older. The median age was 43 years. For every 100 females, there were 97.3 males. For every 100 females age 18 and over, there were 88.3 males.

The median income for a household in the town was $27,778, and for a family was $32,054. Males had a median income of $26,042 versus $12,639 for females. The per capita income for the town was $17,001. About 16.3% of families and 19.7% of the population were below the poverty line, including 35.4% of those under age 18 and 16.9% of those age 65 or over.

Education
The Town of Matador is served by the Motley County Independent School District and home to the Motley County High School Matadors.

Notable people

 Karen Elliott House, Pulitzer Prize-winning journalist and former executive at Dow Jones International
 Roy Ratcliff, Christian minister, was born in Matador
 Stanley Rose, famous Hollywood bookseller of the 1930s, was born in Matador

Climate
According to the Köppen climate classification, Matador has a semiarid climate, BSk on climate maps.

See also
Quitaque Creek
Little Red River (Texas)
Caprock Escarpment
Prairie Dog Town Fork Red River

References

External links
Motley County ISD – Go Mighty Mats!

Matador and Motley County
Matador Ranch Records, Southwest Collection/Special Collections Library, Texas Tech University

Towns in Motley County, Texas
Towns in Texas
County seats in Texas
Populated places established in 1891
1891 establishments in Texas